Atdash is a town in the Gegharkunik Province of Armenia.

See also 
Gegharkunik Province

References 

Populated places in Gegharkunik Province